The New England Patriots generally run a modified Erhardt-Perkins offensive system and a Fairbanks-Bullough 3–4 defensive system, though they have also used a 4–3 defense and increased their use of the nickel defense.

Erhardt-Perkins offensive system
The Patriots run a modified "Ron Erhardt-Ray Perkins" offensive system first installed by Charlie Weis under Bill Belichick. Both Ron Erhardt and Ray Perkins served as offensive assistant coaches under the defensive-minded Chuck Fairbanks while he was head coach of the Patriots in the 1970s. This system is known for its multiple formation and personnel grouping variations on a core number of base plays. Under this system, each formation and each play are separately numbered. Additional word descriptions further modify each play.

Running game
The Erhardt-Perkins system traditionally had a reputation of being a smash-mouth offense that maximizes a team's time of possession and does not frequently call upon its running backs to serve as receivers. Erhardt often said, "throw to score, run to win." This may have been especially true during the years Bill Parcells ran this system as the head coach of the New York Giants.

An example of a running play under this system is Zero, Ride Thirty-six. Zero sets the formation. Thirty indicates who will be the ball carrier running with the ball. Six indicates which hole between the offensive linemen the ball carrier will attempt to run through (see Offensive Nomenclature).

Passing game
This offense traditionally used the run to set up the pass via play-action passing, faking the run in order to throw deep downfield when the defense is least expecting it. Despite its earlier reputation, this system is no longer a run first offense. Erhardt commonly ran the system in his later years spread wide open with multiple receivers (earning the moniker "Air Erhardt"), as NFL rules evolved to benefit the passing game. As a result of this influence, the Patriots will frequently run this offense with five potential receivers and an empty backfield should a favorable matchup present itself or as a function of available personnel. With the addition of Randy Moss and Wes Welker to the Patriots offense in 2007, the Patriots placed an emphasis on a wide open passing attack (with record setting results). As rules of the NFL have loosened to favor the offense, the Patriots have increasingly adopted a wide open approach, to the point that they are often now thought of as a short pass first team. The Patriots have also made good extensive use of the non huddle offense to tire out defensive personnel and to disallow substitutions.

Weis states in his autobiography "No Excuses" that the first play that he called in Super Bowl XXXVI was: Zero Flood Slot Hat, Seventy-eight Shout Tosser. Zero is the base formation: quarterback Tom Brady under center, running back Antowain Smith directly behind Brady, 7 yards in the backfield, and two tight ends, Jermaine Wiggins and Marc Edwards (normally the starting fullback). Flood Slot Hat further modifies this formation to line two wide receivers up to the left (David Patten wide and Troy Brown in the slot), to stack both tight ends on the right side of the formation, and to send running back Smith out to the right wide receiver spot in pre-snap motion. Thus the play began as a run-heavy look, yet at the time of the snap the Patriots had five receivers running pass patterns with an empty backfield. Seventy-eight is the base play number, a three-step drop play. Shout tells the three potential receivers on one side of the quarterback what routes they should run, while Tosser tells the other two potential receivers their patterns. On the actual play, Brady threw a quick slant to Brown for a 21-yard gain, 17 of it after the catch.

Similar offensive systems
Parcells ran the Erhardt-Perkins offensive system during his pro coaching years, which is where Weis originally learned it. Many teams coached by members of the Parcells-Belichick coaching tree currently use this system, such as Notre Dame during Weis' tenure. The Pittsburgh Steelers also continued to run this system during the Bill Cowher years, from when Ron Erhardt was their offensive coordinator. The Carolina Panthers ran this system as well, under Jeff Davidson, a former Belichick assistant.

Comparison to "West Coast" and "Air Coryell" offenses
In the view of some experts, there are only approximately five or six major offensive systems run in the NFL today.

The nomenclature of the Erhardt-Perkins system is very different from the Bill Walsh West Coast offense. Formations under the West Coast offense are commonly named after colors (i.e., Green Right). The west coast offense commonly utilizes high percentage, short slanting passes and running backs as receivers. It prefers to have mobile quarterbacks (since its running backs may not be available to block) and large receivers who are able to gain additional yards after the catch.

Walsh first developed what would become the West Coast offense when he was offensive coordinator of the Cincinnati Bengals, working under head coach Paul Brown. However, Walsh truly perfected this strategy as the head coach of the San Francisco 49ers. His teams were led by quarterback Joe Montana. Montana, who was known for his ability to remain calm under pressure, also possessed good mobility and an accurate passing arm. Another important player in the 49ers offense was Roger Craig, a swift, speedy running back who could also catch passes out of the backfield and was a good receiver. Walsh's 49ers teams also featured several All-Pro wide receivers, including Dwight Clark, John Taylor, and Jerry Rice. The 49ers were one of the NFL's powerhouses in the 1980s and 1990s, under the guidance of head coaches Bill Walsh (1979–1988) and George Seifert (1989–1996). Walsh won three Super Bowls in the 1981, 1984 and 1988 seasons. Seifert won two Super Bowls in 1989 and 1994. Montana, Walsh and Rice are in the Pro Football Hall of Fame, and so is Montana's successor, quarterback Steve Young. Like Montana, Young was a great running quarterback and a very efficient passer.

The nomenclature of the Erhardt-Perkins system is also very different from the Ernie Zampese-Don Coryell "Air Coryell" timed system. Route patterns of the receivers are numbered instead of named in the Air Coryell system (thereby making memorization easier). For example, an Air Coryell play such as "924 F stop swing" indicates that the primary wide receiver (X) should run a 9 pattern (a go), the tight end (Y) should run a 2 pattern (a slant), the secondary wide receiver (Z) should run a 4 pattern (a curl) and the F-back should go out for a swing pass (see Offensive nomenclature). Timing and precision are extremely important under the Air Coryell system, as the routes are intended to run like successive clockwork in order to be successful.

When Don Coryell was the head coach of the San Diego Chargers, his teams led the NFL in passing for six straight years from 1978 to 1983, and again in 1985. Coryell's teams were anchored by the Hall of Fame trio of QB Dan Fouts, WR Charlie Joiner and TE Kellen Winslow. The Air Coryell offense was used successfully by several other coaches. Its history includes Jimmy Johnson's tenure as head coach of the Dallas Cowboys. During his time in Dallas, Johnson won two Super Bowls, and his Cowboys teams featured three Hall of Fame players: QB Troy Aikman, RB Emmitt Smith, and WR Michael Irvin. Johnson's offensive coordinator, Norv Turner, also utilized the Air Coryell offense during his time as an NFL head coach. After two subpar stints leading the Washington Redskins (1994–2000) and the Oakland Raiders (2004–2005), Turner was able to successfully implement the system when he served as head coach of the San Diego Chargers from 2007 to 2012. His Chargers teams showcased the talents of QB Philip Rivers, RB LaDainian Tomlinson and TE Antonio Gates.

The St. Louis Rams ran the Coryell system successfully under coordinator and then head coach Mike Martz. Martz served as St. Louis's offensive coordinator under head coach Dick Vermeil in the 1999 season, when the Rams won Super Bowl XXXIV. Martz then served as the Rams head coach in 2000–2005. His teams were anchored offensively by QB Kurt Warner and RB Marshall Faulk, both of whom are Hall of Famers. Earlier still, Joe Gibbs won 3 Super Bowls running his version of the Coryell offense when he was head coach of the Washington Redskins from 1981–1992 (He also served as Redskins head coach from 2004–2007). Gibbs, who earned induction into the Hall of Fame as a head coach, is the only coach to win 3 Super Bowls with 3 quarterbacks (Joe Theismann, Doug Williams and Mark Rypien).

Recent innovations
Around 2011, Bill Belichick increasingly adopted an up-tempo, no-huddle offense for his team. The idea behind this strategy is for the offense to call plays rapidly without pause and without a huddle. The intention was to tire the defensive side of the ball out more quickly, prevent them from changing their personnel on the field, and limit the complexity of their plays.

In 2014, Bill Belichick implemented creative substitution tactics in the playoffs versus the Baltimore Ravens and Indianapolis Colts. On three plays against the Ravens, the Patriots used four offensive linemen, but had a skill-position player (RB Shane Vereen twice, TE Michael Hoomanawanui once) in the position of an offensive lineman; in each case, Vereen and Hoomanawanui reported as an ineligible receiver, but split wide on the line, confusing the Ravens on which players to cover, similar to the A-11 offense. Taken by surprise, Ravens head coach John Harbaugh protested, but was told by the NFL that the formations were legal, and had been reported properly before each play. After the season, the NFL imposed rule changes prohibiting such substitutions; players who wear eligible numbers at ineligible positions must now place themselves closer to the center.

Fairbanks-Bullough 3–4 defensive system

The New England Patriots run a modified base 3–4 Chuck Fairbanks-Hank Bullough system installed by Bill Belichick. The term 3–4 means that their base formation consists of 3 defensive linemen (defensive end, nose tackle, and defensive end), 4 linebackers (outside "Will" weak side linebacker, middle "Jack" weak side linebacker, middle "Mike" strong side linebacker, and outside "Sam" strong side linebacker), and 4 defensive backs (cornerback, free safety, strong safety, and cornerback). The theory of the system is that a 3–4 structure gives the defense the greatest amount of flexibility because the linebackers are versatile players on defense, capable of rushing the quarterback, tackling runners or dropping into coverage. By mixing the roles of their linebackers from play to play, the Patriot's defense seeks to cause confusion on the part of opposing offenses. At times the Patriots will also shade their defensive linemen different ways, creating "over" or "under" defenses. "Over" and "under" defenses simply refer to the shift of the defensive linemen to the strong or weak side of the offense, respectively, and the rotation of the linebackers in the opposite direction.

The "Fairbanks-Bullough" 3–4 system is known as a two gap system, because each of the defensive linemen are required to cover the gaps to both sides of the offensive lineman that try to block them. Defensive linemen in this system tend to be stouter, as they need to be able to hold their place without being overwhelmed in order to allow the linebackers behind them to make plays. This is the reason that defensive linemen such as Richard Seymour and Vince Wilfork do not always rack up sack and tackle statistics despite their critical importance to the team.

The system is at times more conservative than certain other defenses currently in vogue in the league, despite the constant threat of its potent linebacker blitz. The Patriots defensive system generally places an emphasis on physicality and discipline over mobility and risk taking and is sometimes characterized as a "bend but do not break defense". The Patriots are also known for putting a great deal of emphasis on the front seven (defensive line and linebackers) but less so on the secondary.

History
The 3–4 defense was originally devised by Bud Wilkinson at the University of Oklahoma in the late 1940s. Former Patriots and Oklahoma coach Chuck Fairbanks is credited with being a major figure in first bringing the 3–4 defense to the NFL in 1974. It is unclear if the Patriots under Fairbanks or the Houston Oilers under Bum Phillips were the first team to bring the 3–4 defense to the NFL.

Patriots defensive coordinator Hank Bullough made significant further innovations to the system. Parcells was linebackers coach under Ron Erhardt as head coach of the Patriots in 1980 (after Fairbanks left for Colorado in 1978 and Bullough lost out on the head coaching position). When Parcells returned to the Giants as defensive coordinator under Ray Perkins in 1981, he brought the 3–4 defense with him.

Bill Belichick was initially exposed to the 3–4 defense while working as an assistant under Red Miller, head coach of the Denver Broncos and a former Patriots offensive coordinator under Fairbanks. Joe Collier was the defensive coordinator under Red Miller at the time, and his Orange Crush Defense was very successful at stifling opposing offenses. The Broncos had decided to adopt the 3–4 in 1977. Bill Belichick subsequently refined his understanding of the 3–4 as a linebackers coach and defensive coordinator under Parcells with the Giants. Belichick returned the 3–4 defense back to New England when he became coach of the team in 2000. Romeo Crennel subsequently became defensive coordinator for the team.

In a 2007 press conference Belichick said the following of Fairbanks: "I think Chuck has had a tremendous influence on the league as well as this organization in terms of nomenclature and terminology and those kinds of things. I'm sure Chuck could walk in and look at our playbook and probably 80 percent of the plays are the same terminology that he used - whether it be formations or coverages or pass protections. We were sitting there talking yesterday and he was saying, 'How much 60 protection are you guys using? How much 80 are you using?' All of the stuff that was really the fundamentals of his system are still in place here even, again, to the way we call formations and plays and coverages and some of our individual calls within a call, a certain adjustment or things that Red (Miller) and Hank (Bullough) and Ron (Erhardt) and those guys used when they were here".

Other teams running similar defensive systems
Bill Parcells ran the Fairbanks-Bullough 3–4 defensive system during his coaching years. He served as an NFL head coach for 19 seasons, coaching the New York Giants (1983–1990), New England Patriots (1993–1996), New York Jets (1997–1999) and Dallas Cowboys (2003–2006). Parcells, who won 2 Super Bowls with the Giants in 1986 and 1990, earned a reputation for turning teams that were in a period of decline into postseason contenders. He is the only coach in NFL history to take 4 different teams to the NFL playoffs and 3 different NFL teams to a conference championship game. Parcells enjoyed more successful seasons when Bill Belichick served as his defensive coordinator. In 2013, Bill Parcells was inducted into the Pro Football Hall of Fame.

Many teams coached by members of the Parcells-Belichick coaching tree currently run similar defensive systems, such as the University of Alabama under Nick Saban and the Cleveland Browns under Eric Mangini from 2009–2010.

Comparison to other 3–4 systems
The "Phillips 3–4", a one-gap version of the 3–4, was also brought into the league by Bum Phillips, head coach of the Houston Oilers in the 1970s. The Phillips 3–4 defense is currently run by the San Diego Chargers as well as the Dallas Cowboys formerly coached by Wade Phillips, the son of Bum Phillips. Wade Phillips replaced Joe Collier as defensive coordinator of the Denver Broncos in 1989. The modern Phillips 3–4 is largely a one-gap 3–4 system, meaning that the defensive linemen are often only responsible for one gap between the offensive linemen. The linemen can afford to be more aggressive because they receive more support from the linebackers in performing their roles. This system generally prefers relatively lighter, more agile lineman better able to perform aggressive slants, loops and gap charges in order to directly attempt to sack the quarterback and make tackles.

The 3–4 zone blitz defense was developed by Dick LeBeau as defensive coordinator of the Cincinnati Bengals. Prior to becoming defensive coordinator of the Bengals, LeBeau was tutored by Bengals defensive coordinator Hank Bullough. LeBeau's system commonly calls upon linemen to be mobile enough to drop back into zone coverage in place of blitzing linebackers. Elements of the 3–4 zone blitz defense have been incorporated over time into the modern Phillips 3–4.

Changes to New England's defensive scheme over time
Over time, New England has also used a 4–3 defense and increased its usage of nickel defense. Belichick believes that teaching the techniques and fundamentals of his defense is more important than what alignment his defenses use, noting that he used a 4–3 defense when he coached the Cleveland Browns.

Special teams
The Patriots' special teams strategies have not been as widely studied. Because of the team's offensive success, the team ranks near the bottom of the league in number of punts executed. Of note, the team has consistently employed left-footed punters (including one, Chris Hanson, who could kick with both legs); there has been no discernible statistical advantage to doing so, and the hypothesis that the ball's spin in the opposing direction makes it more difficult to field has never been verified. The Patriots have shown willingness to exploit some of the more esoteric special teams rules; they considered a fair catch kick during Super Bowl LI (opting against it because it was deemed too risky) and have used the drop kick several times: scoring the only known point off a drop kick in the modern era in the last game of the 2006 regular season and using the maneuver at least twice (both unsuccessfully) on onside kick attempts, in 2011 and 2015.

Influence
Under Erhardt's, Perkin’s and Bullough’s stints as coordinators and head coaches across the league after developing the scheme in collaboration with head coach Chuck Fairbanks, the systems developed in New England in the 1970s would begin to see historic use. Influence spread, especially under their coaching tree in Bill Parcells’ schemes as head coach of the New York Giants in the mid-to-late 1980s, after serving as a linebacker coach for the Patriots in 1980.  Parcells would come back to New England as head coach in 1993 and re-install the system used in the 1970s and 1980s, re-uniting with Ray Perkins as WR coach. Parcells own coaching tree would use the scheme created in New England as well, especially Belichick, once he was named as head coach after years of being an assistant to Parcells with the New York Giants, the Patriots, and the New York Jets.

Philosophy
The New England Patriots are noted for the following characteristics under Belichick's tenure, dubbed as the "Patriot Way":

 Their self-critical, perfectionist, and militaristic approach;
 Their emphasis on team, equality among players and lack of individual ego;
 Their strong work ethic, intelligence and high level of focus and preparation for each individual game;
 Their versatile players, able to play multiple positions; and
 Their multiple schemes intended to take advantage of their opponent's weaknesses.

Since 2000, the philosophy in making personnel decisions and in game planning has focused on the "team" concept, stressing preparation, strong work ethic, versatility, and lack of individual ego. This approach, which has led to six Super Bowl victories under Belichick, was analyzed in the 2004 book Patriot Reign as well as the 2021 documentary miniseries Man in the Arena. 

For example, in Super Bowl XXXVI, the Patriots' defense used an aggressive bump and run nickel and dime package instead of their base 3–4 to disrupt the timing of the highly touted Air Coryell system employed by the Rams under Mike Martz (also known as "The Greatest Show on Turf"). This modifiable aspect of the Patriots system is in stark contrast to simpler systems like the Tampa 2 defense, in which the same scheme is often run repeatedly with the emphasis being on execution rather than on flexibility.

In his book How Football Explains America, Sal Paolantonio noted the many parallels between the Patriots' philosophy and military training taught at West Point. This is likely the result of Bill Parcells' having coached at West Point for four years and Bill Belichick's close ties with the Naval Academy.

See also
American football strategy

References

External links
 1997 New York Jets Bill Belichick Defense

New England Patriots
American football strategy